John Duncan MacCallum (July 13, 1918 – May 23, 1982) was a Canadian politician. He served in the Legislative Assembly of New Brunswick from 1963 to 1967 as member of the Liberal party.

References

1918 births
1982 deaths
New Brunswick Liberal Association MLAs
People from Pictou County